Mokopirirakau is a genus of geckos in the family Diplodactylidae. Mokopirirakau is endemic to New Zealand. Mokopirirakau, meaning "forest gecko", is derived from the Maori language.

Species 
The entire genus was previously placed in the genus Hoplodactylus. It includes at least five species:

Mokopirirakau cryptozoicus  – Takitimu gecko
Mokopirirakau galaxias 
Mokopirirakau granulatus  – forest gecko
Mokopirirakau kahutarae  – black-eyed gecko
Mokopirirakau nebulosus  – cloudy gecko

Greater diversity within the genus is expected to emerge from research, including the following populations.
Mokopirirakau "cupola", the Cupola gecko
 Mokopirirakau "Roys Peak", found in Central Otago and Queenstown-Lakes district
 Mokopirirakau "Ōkārito", found in Westland

References

 
Lizard genera
Taxa named by Stuart V. Nielsen
Taxa named by Aaron M. Bauer
Taxa named by Todd R. Jackman
Taxa named by Rod A. Hitchmough
Taxa named by Charles H. Daugherty